Osman Yousefzada is a British interdisciplinary artist, writer and social activist. He launched his eponymous label Osman in 2008, and expanded his practice into a visual art space since 2013, with a ‘zine’ called The Collective - a cross disciplinary publication of themed conversations, between writers, artists, and curators, including, Milovan Farronato, Hans Ulrich Obrist, Nicola Lees, Celia Hempton, Anthea Hamilton, Prem Singh and others. Osman has shown internationally at various institutions, from the Whitechapel Gallery, V&A, Dhaka Art Summit, Lahore Biennale, Lahore Museum, Cincinnati Art Museum, Ringling  Museum, Florida, Almaty Museum and solo at the Ikon Gallery in 2018.

Early life
Osman Yousefzada (Pashto: عثمان یوسفزاده) was born in 1977 in Birmingham to an artisanal family. His Pakistani father was a carpenter, while his mother of Afghan heritage  was a tailor running a dress-making business. He grew up in Balsall Heath, to parents who were unable to read or write in English or their mother tongue. Yousefzada studied anthropology at the SOAS University of London and later did a fashion course at Central Saint Martins. He also received an MPhil from Cambridge University.

Career

Writing
Osman has written on various themes of Race, Labour and marginalised communities.

His memoir The Go Between, about growing up in the 80’s in Birmimgham England in a closed Pakistani migrant community has received critical acclaim. Stephen fry reviewed it as ‘One of the greatest childhood memoirs of our time’. Hanif Kureishi said that it Was ‘Poetic and moving’ and The Guardian reviewed it as magic behind closed doors.

Visual art

Yousefzada first solo exhibition at the critically acclaimed contemporary art space - Ikon Gallery in 2018, was called “Being Somewhere Else’. The exhibition was made to demonstrate the inequalities in the contemporary fashion world, as well as exploring marginalised voices and experiences within migration.

Yousefzada created a short film named Her Dreams are Bigger about garment workers in Bangladesh which was shown at the Whitechapel Gallery in London.

In 2020, Yousefzada created an installation putting the conversation of Migration into the heart of the city - titled Infinity Pattern 1. It is the largest public art canvas which was installed as a temporary hoarding facade at the Selfridges site in Birmingham. It is expected to remain until the 2022 Commonwealth Games. This was Yousefzada's first work of public art.

Fashion
Yousefzada launched his eponymous label, Osman, in 2008. He earned a reputation at London's fashion weeks that year mostly by the black dresses he designed, which prompted the U.S. Vogue magazine to call him the "re-inventor of the Little Black Dress".

Within a few years of launching his label, Yousefzada had become a "fashion powerhouse". Some of his famous clients include Beyoncé, Emily Blunt and Lady Gaga. Beyoncé wore an Osman dress at the 55th Annual Grammy Awards.

In 2016 he won the Outstanding Achievement in Art & Design at the 6th Asian Awards.

He launched his first solo exhibition at the Ikon Gallery in 2018. The exhibition was made to demonstrate the inequalities in the contemporary fashion world, as well as experiences with migration.

In 2019, Yousefzada opened up a temporary space in London's Floral Street which he named House of Osman.

Style
Yousefzada has claimed that his Asian heritage inspired some of his cuts and that many of his works are done in Pakistan and India. Recently for a capsule collection for fall 2022, Yousefzada made designs to celebrate South Asian identity, using fabrics and inspirations from India, Pakistan and Afghanistan. Some of his designs have also had inspirations from Maasai tribes and Ancient Greece.

References

External links
 Official Website of Osman London

Clothing brands of the United Kingdom
English businesspeople in fashion
English fashion designers
People from Birmingham, West Midlands
British Asian people
British people of Afghan descent
British people of Pakistani descent
British contemporary artists
Pashtun people
1974 births
Living people